Edward Fielding (March 19, 1875 – January 10, 1945) was an American stage and film actor.

Career 
Edward Fielding appeared in nearly 40 Broadway productions between 1905 and 1939, often in leading roles. He played as a leading man with famous stage actresses like Olga Nethersole, Grace George, Ethel Barrymore and Laura Hope Crews. The tall and dignified-looking actor was especially known for his roles in the works of playwright Henrik Ibsen. Fielding also worked for some time as an actor in London. He appeared occasionally in silent films, most notably as Dr. Watson in Sherlock Holmes (1916) with William Gillette in the leading role.

Fielding came to Hollywood in 1939 and appeared in over 80 films during the last years of his life. He usually played bit parts or supporting roles. Fielding was a favorite of Alfred Hitchcock and played in four Hitchcock movies between 1940 and 1945. His best-known role for Hitchcock was perhaps Frith, the old butler, in Rebecca (1940). He also played supporting roles in films like Kitty Foyle (1940) with Ginger Rogers, Billy Wilder's American film debut The Major and the Minor (1942, as Rita Johnson's and Diana Lynn's father) and In This Our Life (1942) starring Bette Davis and Olivia de Havilland. Fielding was usually typecasted in dignified or respectable roles as a Doctor, Official, Judge, Priest or Butler.

Death and personal life 
Fielding collapsed and died of a heart attack while he mowed his lawn. He was two months shy of his 70th birthday. His wife, Elizabeth Sherman Clark (1883–1959), was a Metropolitan Opera star. They had one child.

Partial filmography 

 Sherlock Holmes (1916) - Dr. Watson
 The Runaway (1917) - Foster
 Magda (1917) - Kellner
 The Beautiful Adventure (1917) - Count Michael D'Eguzon
 The Eternal Temptress (1917) - Prince Estezary
 Seeing Things (1917)
 The Invisible Man Returns (1940) - Prison Governor (uncredited)
 Abe Lincoln in Illinois (1940) - Minor Role (uncredited)
 Vigil in the Night (1940) - Forest - Epidemic Doctor (uncredited)
 The House Across the Bay (1940) - Judge
 Rebecca (1940) - Frith
 All This, and Heaven Too (1940) - Dr. Louis
 Maryland (1940) - Chairrnan (uncredited)
 Junior G-Men (1940, Serial) - Professor Farraday [Chs. 9-10] (uncredited)
 Down Argentine Way (1940) - Willis Crawford
 East of the River (1940) - University President (uncredited)
 South of Suez (1940) - Judge
 Victory (1940) - Fetherston (uncredited)
 Kitty Foyle (1940) - Uncle Edgar
 So Ends Our Night (1941) - Durant
 Rage in Heaven (1941) - Governor (uncredited)
 I Wanted Wings (1941) - President of the Court
 Scotland Yard (1941) - Pickering
 In the Navy (1941) - Commander Giving Speech (uncredited)
 Blondie in Society (1941) - Blondie's Lawyer (uncredited)
 Blossoms in the Dust (1941) - Judge (uncredited)
 Our Wife (1941) - Dr. Mandel (uncredited)
 Parachute Battalion (1941) - Chief of Infantry
 Belle Starr (1941) - (uncredited)
 Badlands of Dakota (1941) - Councilman (uncredited)
 Hold Back the Dawn (1941) - American Consul (uncredited)
 Suspicion (1941) - Antique Shop Proprietor (uncredited)
 Skylark (1941) - Scholarly Man in Subway Car
 Star Spangled Rhythm (1942) - Y. Frank Freemont (uncredited)
 In This Our Life (1942) - Dr. Buchanan
 Pacific Rendezvous (1942) - Secretary of the Navy
 Ten Gentlemen from West Point (1942) - William Eustis
 Beyond the Blue Horizon (1942) - Judge Chase
 The Pride of the Yankees (1942) - Clinic Doctor
 The Major and the Minor (1942) - Colonel Hill
 Random Harvest (1942) - Prime Minister (uncredited)
 Shadow of a Doubt (1943) - Doctor on Train (uncredited)
 Flight for Freedom (1943) - Rear Admiral Sturges (uncredited)
 Submarine Alert (1943) - Shipping Merchant (uncredited)
 Flesh and Fantasy (1943) - Sir Thomas (uncredited)
 It's a Great Life (1943) - Attorney Schuster #1 (uncredited)
 Mr. Lucky (1943) - Foster - Dorothy's Butler (uncredited)
 Crime Doctor (1943) - Governor (uncredited)
 Pilot No. 5 (1943) - Dean Barrett (uncredited)
 Good Luck, Mr. Yates (1943) - Colonel Fredericks (uncredited)
 Salute to the Marines (1943) - Preacher (uncredited)
 Three Smart Guys (1943, Short) - Fisherman
 Government Girl (1943) - Mr. Benson (uncredited)
 Higher and Higher (1943) - Minister (uncredited)
 Madame Curie (1943) - Board Member (uncredited)
 The Song of Bernadette (1943) - Doctor with Empress' Baby (uncredited)
 What a Woman! (1943) - Sen. Howard Ainsley
 Tender Comrade (1943) - Doctor (uncredited)
 Lady in the Dark (1944) - Dr. Carlton
 See Here, Private Hargrove (1944) - Gen. Dillon
 The Story of Dr. Wassell (1944) - Adm. Hart (uncredited)
 Mr. Skeffington (1944) - Justice of the Peace (uncredited)
 Marine Raiders (1944) - Commander of Camp Elliott (uncredited)
 Wilson (1944) - Minor Role (uncredited)
 My Pal Wolf (1944) - Secretary of War
 Mrs. Parkington (1944) - Rev. Pilbridge (uncredited)
 The Very Thought of You (1944) - Prof. Cathcart (uncredited)
 Dead Man's Eyes (1944) - Stanley Hayden
 Belle of the Yukon (1944) - C.V. Atterbury
 Ministry of Fear (1944) - Ministry Executive (uncredited)
 The Man in Half Moon Street (1945) - Col. Ashley (uncredited)
 Having Wonderful Crime (1945) - Dr. Newcomb (uncredited)
 A Medal for Benny (1945) - Governor (uncredited)
 The Beautiful Cheat (1945) - Dr. Pennypacker
 Guest Wife (1945) - Arnold
 Spellbound (1945) - Dr. Anthony Edwardes (uncredited)
 Hold That Blonde (1945) - J.W. Kellogg (uncredited)
 Saratoga Trunk (1945) - Mr. Bowers (uncredited)
 Colonel Effingham's Raid (1946) - Mr. Clyde Manadue (uncredited)
 Cinderella Jones (1946) - Dean Barker (uncredited) (final film role)

References

External links 
 
 
 Edward Fielding at AllMovie
 The Edward Fielding and Elizabeth Sherman Clark papers, 1876-1975, held by the Billy Rose Theatre Division, New York Public Library for the Performing Arts

1875 births
1945 deaths
American male film actors
20th-century American male actors
American male stage actors